Pishan may refer to:

Pishan County, in Hotan Prefecture, Xinjiang, China
Pishan Town, in Pishan County, Hotan Prefecture, Xinjiang, China
Pishan Island, an island in Chekiang Province, Republic of China